James B. McDonald was a Scottish amateur footballer who made over 220 appearances in the Scottish League for Queen's Park as a right half. He represented Scotland at amateur level.

References

Year of birth missing
Scottish footballers
Scottish Football League players
Queen's Park F.C. players
Place of death missing
Date of death missing
Association football forwards
Association football midfielders
Scotland amateur international footballers
Footballers from Edinburgh
London Caledonians F.C. players
King's Park F.C. players
Heart of Midlothian F.C. players
Civil Service Strollers F.C players